The Otú Norte or Otú-Pericos Fault is an inactive sinistral oblique strike-slip fault in the department of Antioquia in northern Colombia. Together with the parallel Bagre Norte Fault the fault separates the Central Ranges from its northeasternmost continuation, the Serranía de San Lucas.

Etymology 
The fault was by Feininger et al. in 1972 named after Otú Airport in vereda Otú in Remedios, Antioquia.

Description 
The Otú Norte Fault crosses the northern part of the Central Ranges of the Colombian Andes. The fault strikes north-northwest to south-southeast and appears to branch off the Palestina Fault. The Otú Fault extends in a northwest direction to near Nechí, where it is covered by young Quaternary deposits. The sinistral oblique reverse fault separates blocks of totally dissimilar geology and lithology; the metamorphic Precambrian San Lucas Complex and Jurassic igneous rocks (diorites) of the Segovia Batholith on the east are juxtaposed against the Cretaceous Santa Isabel Stock and Paleozoic quartz-feldspar gneisses and quartzitic arc rocks of the Cajamarca Complex on the west. Just west of Remedios, the fault forms the contact between the Cretaceous Antioquia and Jurassic Segovia Batholiths. The northern end apparently splays into several faults that cross the Nechí River.

Activity 

Economic importance 

The fault separates two major gold mining areas in Antioquia; the Segovia-Remedios mining district and La Ye mine in the east, and the placer deposits of Gramalote and Cisneros in the west. North of Zaragoza, the fault underlies the El Limón mine. Antioquia produces 50% of all gold in Colombia.

The ductile zone of the fault produced mylonites in mainly the amphibolite facies of the Segovia Batholith. This ductile behavior was later overprinted by fragile tectonics, leaving cataclasis and fault breccias in the fault zone as well as striations in the quartz of the batholith. These deformations are interpreted as second grade Riedel shears.

See also 

 List of earthquakes in Colombia
 Romeral Fault System
 Bagre Norte Fault

References

Bibliography

Maps

Further reading 
 

Seismic faults of Colombia
Strike-slip faults
Thrust faults
Inactive faults
Faults